Mohammad Temim, also Haji Mohammad Temim (French: Aggi Mohamed) was an ambassador of the Moroccan king Mulay Ismail to France. Mohammad Temim was accompanied by Ali Manino, as well as six other ambassadorial members. They visited Paris in 1682. He was able to explore many aspects of French intellectual and artistic life. He attended a performance of Lully's Atys. He also visited Notre-Dame de Paris where he attended an organ performance. Mohammad Temin showed great interest in arts and sciences. Upon his return, he received beautiful farewell gifts from Louis XIV.

Another Moroccan ambassador Abdallah bin Aisha would visit France in 1699-1700.

Notes

References
 Matar, Nabil In the Lands of the Christians. Arabic Travel Writing in the Seventeenth Century New York London, Routledge 

Ambassadors of Morocco to France
Moroccan diplomats
17th-century Moroccan people
17th-century diplomats